Goderdzi Berdelidze (born 14 July 1996) is a Georgian weightlifter. He represented Georgia at the 2019 World Weightlifting Championships, as well as the 2018 European Weightlifting Championships.

Results 
 2016 European Junior Weightlifting Championships – Men's 62 kg – 3rd place
 2017 European U23 Weightlifting Championships – Men's 56 kg – 3rd place
 2019 European U23 Weightlifting Championships – Men's 56 kg – 1st place
  – 4th place
 2019 World Weightlifting Championships – Men's 61 kg – 12th place

References

External links 
 

1996 births
Living people
Male weightlifters from Georgia (country)